Presentation High School may refer to:
 Presentation Academy, Louisville, Kentucky, United States
 Presentation High School, San Jose, California, United States
 Presentation of Mary Academy, Methuen, Massachusetts, United States

Internationally
 Presentation Convent High School, Srinagar, Jammu and Kashmir, India
 Presentation National High School, Benin City, Nigeria
 Presentation Convent Girls High School, Rawalpindi, Pakistan
 Presentation Convent High School, Murree, Pakistan
 Presentation Convent School, Peshawar, Pakistan
 Presentation Convent School, Jhelum, Pakistan
 Presentation Convent High School, Sargodha, Pakistan

See also
 Presentation College (disambiguation)
 Presentation (disambiguation)